No. 1325 (Transport) Flight comprising three Douglas Dakota aircraft, formed at RAF Dishforth, North Yorkshire, on 1 August 1956 to support Operation Buffalo and Operation Antler British nuclear tests at Maralinga. 1325 Flight was soon relocated to Christmas Island (Kiritimati) to support the Grapple series of nuclear tests in that remote Pacific region.

Squadron Leader W.J. (Joe) Hurst was placed in command of 1325 Flight and was awarded the AFC for his exemplary service. He was CO for 'Grapple' and part of 'Grapple X'. The CO for the remaining 'Grapple X' and all 'Grapple Y' was a Squadron Leader Wood.

While at Christmas Island, regular supply flights were made to support the weather and observation sites located at Fanning and Malden Islands for the nuclear tests. Because some islands had no landing strips, 1325 Flight devised a "bouncing palette" system (similar to Barnes Wallis’s bouncing bomb) to deliver supplies. Occasional flights were also made to Nandi in Fiji, Faleolo (Apia) in Western Samoa, Rarotonga Island, and New Caledonia Island.

Because of limited maintenance facilities at Christmas Island, the Dakota aircraft were rotated to the de Havilland aircraft works at Bankstown, Sydney, Australia for "Base servicing". On these flights, the 1325 Flight Dakotas were routed via Canton Island, Fiji and Brisbane. The 1325 Flight Dakotas had extra fuel tanks mounted within the fuselage to extend the range to 2,400 miles. The Dakotas had servicing facilities on the Island. While at Christmas Island 1325 Flight became known as "Christmas Airways", a nickname created by the CO, Squadron Leader W J Hurst, and had that legend painted on both sides of the aircraft fuselage. The ground crew serviced various civilian aircraft ferrying food to the island. The ground crew were merged with the Transport Command Servicing Team groundcrew, who serviced the RAF Hastings aircraft which were used to transport service personnel as well as food that was flown from Hickam USAF field in Honolulu.

Once the tests had been completed and operations at Christmas Island terminated, 1325 flight was disbanded at RAF Changi in Singapore, on 1 May 1960.

Aircraft operated

Another Dakota Mk4, KN649, not on the strength of 1325 Flight but being used to train its aircrew, crashed near RAF Dishforth on 27 August 1957 with the loss of three crew members.
Loaned to Dishforth for this training program, the aircraft was based at Bovingdon where it had been used as personal transport by the C in C Coastal Command.

Flight bases

References
Notes

Bibliography

 Delve, Ken. The Source Book of the RAF. Shrewsbury, Shropshire, UK: Airlife Publishing, 1994. .
 CO 1325 Flight Squadron Leader W J Hurst
 Lake, Alan. Flying Units of the RAF. Shrewsbury, Shropshire, UK: Airlife Publishing, 1999. .
 Sturtivant, Ray, and John Hamlin. RAF Flying Training And Support Units since 1912. Tonbridge, Kent, UK: Air-Britain (Historians) Ltd., 2007. .

1325 Flight
Military units and formations established in 1956
Royal Air Force
Military units and formations disestablished in 1960
1956 establishments in the United Kingdom
1960 disestablishments in the United Kingdom